The Two Ronnies 1987 Christmas Special was first broadcast on BBC1 on Christmas Day 1987 as part of the 12th series of the show starring Ronnie Barker and Ronnie Corbett, being also their last outing as Barker decided to retire from showbiz.

Memorable sketches included Pinocchio II: Killer Doll, a parody of the slasher films popular at the time. The musical guest was Elton John.

At the time the special aired, no one except Corbett knew about Barker's decision, mostly influenced by concerns over his own health: The deaths of fellow comedians Richard Beckinsale (with whom he starred in Porridge) in 1979 and Eric Morecambe in 1984 reportedly frightened him.

1987 television specials
Christmas television specials
Christmas in the United Kingdom
1987 in British television
BBC television sketch shows
British television series finales